Francis Patrick Dominic Mulvihill (8 August 1909 – 24 November 1965) was an Irish long-distance runner. He competed in the marathon at the 1948 Summer Olympics.

References

1909 births
1965 deaths
Athletes (track and field) at the 1948 Summer Olympics
Irish male long-distance runners
Irish male marathon runners
Olympic athletes of Ireland
Place of birth missing